Navahermosa is a village in the province of Toledo and autonomous community of Castile-La Mancha, Spain.

References

External links

Populated places in the Province of Toledo
 auto